The Upper Hand is a British television sitcom broadcast by ITV from 1 May 1990 to 14 October 1996. The programme was adapted from the American sitcom Who's the Boss?.

As in the former series, affluent single woman Caroline Wheatley, raising her son with the help of her mother Laura West, hires a housekeeper and a man called Charlie Burrows applies for the job.

Premise
Down on his luck, former footballer Charlie Burrows (Joe McGann) moves from a deprived area of London to leafy Henley-on-Thames in Oxfordshire to make a better life for his daughter Joanna (Kellie Bright), by taking a job as housekeeper for well-off advertising executive Caroline Wheatley (Diana Weston). Although Caroline is unsure about employing him, her man-eating mother Laura West (Honor Blackman) talks her into it. Soon the two become friends, Caroline's son Tom (William Puttock) comes to see Charlie as a father figure, and Joanna enjoys having a female influence in her life.

Both Caroline and Charlie repeatedly attempt to find love elsewhere, denying their blossoming feelings for each other. For years they lead the viewer on a "will-they-won't-they" chase that lasts until the end of the sixth series when the pair marry. After initial plans to end the series there, ITV commissioned a seventh series featuring Charlie and Caroline as husband and wife, which went beyond the premise of the original American version.

Cast and characters

Main
Charlie Burrows (Joe McGann) - A former footballer whose career was curtailed by injury, Charlie is also a single dad to daughter Joanna since his wife Debbie's death. Down on his luck and living in a deprived area of London, Charlie takes a housekeeper's job in Henley-on-Thames to give Joanna a better life. Confident, charming and something of a joker, he is a contrast to the more serious Caroline and helps to loosen her up over time. A running joke is that, while Charlie sees himself very much as a traditional man, he enthusiastically embraces a stereotypically female job and its tasks.
Caroline Wheatley (Diana Weston) - A successful advertising executive who, while confident in the business world, struggles in her personal life. Separated from her unreliable husband, Caroline shares her life with her son Tom (whom she over-indulges) and her young-at-heart mother Laura, who constantly tries to find her daughter a man. She is somewhat buttoned-up, but begins to take a more relaxed approach to life under Charlie's influence.
Laura West (Honor Blackman) - Caroline's glamorous and young-at-heart mother who lives in an annex of her daughter's house. Something of a man-eater, she dates a string of different men throughout the course of the series. It is Laura who initially hires Charlie, mainly because of his looks, but when she spots the chemistry between him and Caroline she does everything she can to encourage a relationship between them. Although Laura frequently makes cracks at Caroline's expense, she genuinely loves her daughter and can be very protective of her.
Joanna Burrows (Kellie Bright) - Charlie's daughter; an outgoing, confident girl who is something of a tomboy in early episodes, but becomes more typically "girly" as she reaches her teens. She initially resents Caroline, finding her stuck-up, but comes to appreciate having a woman around as she goes through puberty. Just as Caroline is influenced by Charlie, Jo's confidence rubs off on Tom.
Tom Wheatley (William Puttock) - Caroline's son, whom she over-indulges somewhat to compensate for the lack of his father's presence. Although academically intelligent beyond his years, Tom is socially naïve and struggles to make friends. He comes to see Charlie, who encourages him in more typically "boyish" pursuits such as football, as a father figure, as well as becoming close to Jo (although she often treats him as an annoyance as she gets older).

Minor and recurring
Michael Wheatley (Nicky Henson) - Caroline's unreliable estranged (later ex-) husband; a documentary maker who spends most of his time in the jungle. The two briefly attempt a reconciliation, but this fails when Michael struggles to settle down. He later remarries and plans to fight for custody of Tom, until his much younger wife Tiffany decides she is not ready for motherhood.
Nick Murray (Anthony Newley) - Joanna's maternal grandfather, who has a difficult relationship with Charlie, having never believed him good enough for his late daughter Debbie. A shady character, Nick spends time in prison for fraud; the revelation which of upsets Jo, because Charlie had told her that her grandfather had moved to Spain.
Auntie Pat (Lynda Baron) - Charlie's godmother; a lively, kind-hearted woman with a habit of pinching people's cheeks in greeting (to the point that other characters instinctively protect their faces on seeing her).
Al (Charlie Creed-Miles) - Auntie Pat's uncle (although several years younger than her). A former young offender, he attempts to turn his life around by training as a hairdresser. Charlie takes him under his wing, but is less keen on having him around when he spots an attraction between Al and Jo.
Katie (Joanna Forest)
Tom (Jack Bernhardt) An easily confused handyman who has a brief affair with Laura.

Theme tune
The theme music was written by Debbie Wiseman. A piano version of the theme titled Joe & Diana was released in 2011 on her album Piano Stories.

Episodes

Home media 

The Upper Hand was first released on VHS format in the United Kingdom, where three volumes containing various episodes were made available from Columbia Tristar Home Entertainment. All seven series of The Upper Hand have been released in 2010 and 2011 in the United Kingdom via Network.

VHS

DVD

References

External links

1990 British television series debuts
1996 British television series endings
1990s British sitcoms
British television series based on American television series
ITV sitcoms
Carlton Television
Television series by Sony Pictures Television
Television shows set in Oxfordshire
Television series by ITV Studios
English-language television shows
Television shows produced by Central Independent Television